Richard Hammond's Engineering Connections is a British documentary series originally broadcast on the National Geographic Channel, and later on BBC2. It is presented by Richard Hammond, and looks at how engineers and designers use historic inventions and clues from the natural world in ingenious ways to develop new buildings and machines. The show's format is very similar to that of James Burke's 1978 documentary series, Connections. The first series premièred on 8 September 2008, on National Geographic, and on 1 March 2010, on BBC2. The first series contained four episodes. The second series premièred on 7 September 2009, on National Geographic, and on 8 May 2010, on BBC2. The second series contained six episodes. The third series premièred on 8 May 2011, on BBC2 and contained six episodes. The BBC2 broadcasts of the first two series have a slightly shorter running time and contain less information than the original National Geographic broadcasts, with on average one minute of footage cut from every episode. None of the three series of the programme are available to purchase on DVD in the UK, however, all three can be watched on demand for subscribers of National Geographic on Sky, Virgin Media and BT Vision. In Australia, all three series are available on DVD, either separately or as a box-set.

Episode list

Series 1 (2008)

Series 2 (2009)

Series 3 (2011)

BBC2 episodes ratings

Series 1

See also 
Mega Builders
Extreme Engineering
Megastructures (TV series)
Ultimate Factories

References

External links
 Richard Hammonds Engineering Connections at National Geographic Channel
 
 

2008 British television series debuts
2011 British television series endings
BBC television documentaries
British television documentaries
Documentary television series about technology
English-language television shows